The Bills are a high-impact, acoustic folk music quintet from the West Coast of Canada. Formed in 1996 (as The Bill Hilly Band), they have performed extensively throughout North America and Europe, with their strongest followings in Western Canada, the Western US, Ontario and the UK.

Though the lineup has had a few changes since the band first formed, the present-day Bills are:

 Marc Atkinson - mandolin, guitar, vocals
 Richard Moody - violin, viola, vocals
 Chris Frye - guitar, lead vocals
 Adrian Dolan - fiddle, piano, accordion, vocals
 Scott 'Grampa Bill' White - upright bass, vocals

The group has also toured and recorded with both Joey Smith and Nick Mintenko on bass; Glen Manders ("Reverend Bill Bass") was the bassist from 1998 to 2008.

Awards 
At the 2006 Western Canadian Music Awards, The Bills won the award for Entertainer of the Year. Their video for the song Old Blue Bridge was nominated for Video of the Year.

The Bills received a nomination for Roots and Traditional Album of the Year - Group at the 2005 Juno Awards

Discography 
Albums

Contributing artist

References

External links 
 

Canadian folk music groups
Musical groups established in 1996
Red House Records artists